Three ships of the Hellenic Navy have been named Kimon:

 , the former  USS Ringgold (DD-500); launched, 1942; served as Z-2 (D171) in the West German Navy, 1959–1981; acquired by the Hellenic Navy, 1981; stricken and scrapped, 1993
 , the former  USS Semmes (DDG-18); launched, 1961; acquired by the Hellenic Navy, 1991; decommissioned, June 2004; scrapped, 2006
 , a  under construction since 2021, projected to be commissioned in 2025.

Hellenic Navy ship names